The 2004–05 Turkish Basketball League was the 39th season of the top-tier professional basketball league in Turkey. The season started on October 22, 2004. Efes Pilsen won their twelfth national championship this season.

Regular season

League table

Turkish Basketball Federation has decided to increase the number of the teams in the Turkish Basketball First League to 16 for the next season.  As a result of these there were no relegation for the 2004–05 season.  Mersin BŞB. and Beykozspor have won promotion from the second league and will play the 2006–07 season in the Turkish Basketball First League.

Turkish Basketball League 2004–05 play-offs

Quarterfinal and Semifinal series are 5-match series. The teams reaches the first 3 wins is through to the next round.  The team which has won both regular season match-ups starts with a 1–0 lead to the series.

Final series are 7-match series and the team reaches first 4 wins is the champion of the Turkish Basketball League.

2004–05 play-off seedings, results, and schedules

Quarterfinals

(1) Efes Pilsen (24–2) vs. (8) Tekelspor (10–16)   (Series starts 1–0)
Game 1 8 May 2005, Istanbul:       Efes Pilsen: 78, Tekelspor: 61 (2–0)
Game 2 10 May 2005, Istanbul:       Tekelspor: 72, Efes Pilsen: 99 (0–3)

Efes Pilsen wins the series 3:0

(2) Ülkerspor (21–5) vs. (7) Türk Telekom (13–13)   (Series starts 1–0)
Game 1 9 May 2005, Istanbul:       Ülkerspor: 105, Türk Telekom: 93 (2–0)
Game 2 11 May 2005, Ankara:       Türk Telekom: 85, Ülkerspor: 93 (0–3)

Ülkerspor wins the series 3:0

(3) Beşiktaş (17–9) vs. (6) Tuborg Pilsener (16–10)   (Series starts 0–0)
Game 1 9 May 2005, Istanbul:       Beşiktaş: 97, Tuborg Pilsener: 77 (1–0)
Game 2 11 May 2005, Istanbul:       Beşiktaş: 91, Tuborg Pilsener: 85 (2–0)
Game 3 13 May 2005, Izmir:       Tuborg Pilsener: 78, Beşiktaş: 85 (0–3)

Beşiktaş wins the series 3:0

(4) Fenerbahçe (16–10) vs. (5) Pınar Karşıyaka (16–10)   (Series starts 0–0)
Game 1 8 May 2005, Istanbul:       Fenerbahçe: 85, Pınar Karşıayaka: 59 (1–0)
Game 2 10 May 2005, Istanbul:       Fenerbahçe: 77, Pınar Karşıayaka: 67 (2–0)
Game 3 12 May 2005, Izmir:       Pınar Karşıayaka: 71, Fenerbahçe: 86 (0–3)

Fenerbahçe wins the series 3:0

Semifinals

(1) Efes Pilsen (24–2) vs. (4) Fenerbahçe (16–10)   (Series starts 0–0)
Game 1 18 May 2005, Istanbul:       Efes Pilsen: 88, Fenerbahçe: 84 (1–0)
Game 2 21 May 2005, Istanbul:       Efes Pilsen: 87, Fenerbahçe: 78 (2–0)
Game 3 23 May 2005, Istanbul:       Fenerbahçe: 82, Efes Pilsen: 80 (1–2)
Game 4 26 May 2005, Istanbul:       Fenerbahçe: 63, Efes Pilsen: 70 (1–3)

Efes Pilsen wins the series 3:1

(2) Ülkerspor (21–5) vs. (3) Beşiktaş (17–9)   (Series starts 0–1)
Game 1 19 May 2005, Istanbul:       Beşiktaş: 74, Ülkerspor: 73 (2–0)
Game 2 22 May 2005, Istanbul:       Ülkerspor: 96, Beşiktaş: 92 (1–2)
Game 3 24 May 2005, Istanbul:       Ülkerspor: 77, Beşiktaş: 83 (1–3)

Beşiktaş wins the series 3:1

League Finals

(1) Efes Pilsen (24–2) vs. (8) Beşiktaş (17–9)     (Series starts 1–0)
Game 1 30 May 2005, Istanbul:       Efes Pilsen: 73, Beşiktaş: 68 (2–0)
Game 2 2 June 2005, Istanbul:       Beşiktaş: 78, Efes Pilsen: 73 (1–2)
Game 3 5 June 2005, Istanbul:       Beşiktaş: 78, Efes Pilsen: 93 (1–3)
Game 4 7 June 2005, Istanbul:       Efes Pilsen: 78, Beşiktaş: 68 (4–1)

Efes Pilsen wins the series 4:1.

External links
 Turkish Basketball League Official Website
 Turkish Basketball Federation Official Website
 TBLStat.net 

Turkish Basketball Super League seasons
Turkish
1